The name Trami has been used to name four tropical cyclones in the northwestern Pacific Ocean. The name was submitted by Vietnam and refers to a tree in the rose family.
 Tropical Storm Trami (2001) (T0105, 07W, Gorio) – impacted Taiwan before crossing the island and dissipating in the strait as a depression.
 Tropical Storm Trami (2006) (T0623, 26W, Tomas) – not a threat to land.
 Severe Tropical Storm Trami (2013) (T1312, 12W, Maring) – caused flooding in the Philippines
 Typhoon Trami (2018) (T1824, 28W, Paeng) – a Category 5 super typhoon which affected Taiwan and Japan in mid-September.

Pacific typhoon set index articles